Dash and Lilly is a 1999 American biographical drama television film about writers Dashiell Hammett and Lillian Hellman. The film was directed by actress Kathy Bates, written by Jerry Ludwig, and stars Sam Shepard and Judy Davis. It aired on A&E on May 31, 1999.

Plot
The lives of Dashiell Hammett and Lillian Hellman are set against the golden era of Hollywood, HUAC and the issue of McCarthyism of the 1950s. This intimate look at the lives of two of this century's literary titans follows their tumultuous affair, drinking bouts, career highs and lows, and activities in support of left-wing causes including Hammett's public avowal of Communism and his membership in the Communist Party and Hellman's sympathies for the Stalinist regime in the Soviet Union before World War II.

Cast
Sam Shepard as Dashiell Hammett
Judy Davis as Lillian Hellman
Bebe Neuwirth as Dorothy Parker
Laurence Luckinbill as Joseph Rauh (Lillian's attorney)
David Paymer as Arthur Kober (Lillian's husband)
Željko Ivanek as Mel Berman

Production
Filming took place in Toronto.

Awards and nominations

References

External links

1999 films
1999 drama films
1990s American films
1990s biographical drama films
1990s English-language films
A&E (TV network) original films
American biographical drama films
American drama television films
Biographical films about writers
Biographical television films
Cultural depictions of screenwriters
Dashiell Hammett
Films about the Hollywood blacklist
Films directed by Kathy Bates
Films shot in Toronto